Unwired: Latin America is a world music benefit compilation album originally released in 2001, with proceeds going to Amnesty International. Part of the World Music Network Rough Guides series, the release features Latin American acoustic music. The compilation was produced by Phil Stanton, co-founder of the World Music Network. Duncan Baker coordinated the project and wrote the liner notes.

Brazil is the source of four tracks, Argentina three, Cuba and Bolivia contribute two each, and Costa Rica, Belize, Peru, Chile, Colombia, and Mexico are all represented once.

Track listing

References 

2001 compilation albums
World Music Network Rough Guide albums